Into Your Lungs, also referred to as Into Your Lungs (and around in your heart, and on through your blood) is the second studio album by Hey Rosetta!, released on June 3, 2008. It was produced by Hawksley Workman.

The album won Album of the Year at the inaugural Verge Music Awards and ChartAttack.com Favourite Album at the annual Indie Awards during 2009's Canadian Music Week.  The album was nominated for the 2008 Atlantis Music Prize and was shortlisted for the 2009 Polaris Music Prize.

Track listing

References 

Hey Rosetta! albums
2008 albums